Qeshlaq-e Jalilabad (also Romanized as Qeshlāq-e Jalīlābād) is a village in Jalilabad Rural District, Jalilabad District, Pishva County, Tehran Province, Iran. At the 2006 census, its population was 596, in 141 families.

References 

Populated places in Pishva County